Terry Cavaretta aka Terry Cavaretta-St. Jules (born 1953) is a prominent American aerialist.

In 1977, she became the first woman to perform a quadruple somersault on flying trapeze.  She is listed in the Guinness Book of Records for achieving the most triple somersaults.   She was also the first aerialist to perform a triple back somersault with one and a half twists.
   
She was inducted into the Ring of Fame in 2009 and the International Circus Hall of Fame in 2014.

Career

She initially gained prominence as a member of the "Flying Cavarettas" at Circus Circus in Las Vegas, where she performed from 1968 to 1991.

In 2012, Cavaretta founded a trapeze school in Las Vegas.

Personal 

Cavaretta married trapeze catcher Roland "Ron" Eloy in 1971. She married Réjean St. Jules, a juggler, in 1983.  Cavaretta and St. Jules have one son, Sebastian St. Jules (b. 2001).

References 

American acrobatic gymnasts
1953 births
Living people